Cascade Township is one of seventeen townships in Dubuque County, Iowa, United States.  As of the 2000 census, its population was 1,079.

History
The name of Cascade Township is derived from the cascade, or water power, with which early settlers powered their mills.

Geography
According to the United States Census Bureau, Cascade Township covers an area of 35.78 square miles (92.68 square kilometers).

Cities, towns, villages
 Cascade (partial)

Adjacent townships
 Dodge Township (north)
 Taylor Township (northeast)
 Whitewater Township (east)
 Washington Township, Jones County (southeast)
 Richland Township, Jones County (south)
 Lovell Township, Jones County (southwest)
 South Fork Township, Delaware County (west)
 North Fork Township, Delaware County (northwest)

Cemeteries
The township contains these five cemeteries: Cascade Protestant, Johns Creek, Saint Martins Catholic, Saint Marys Catholic and Zion Reform.

Major highways
  U.S. Route 151
  Iowa Highway 136

School districts
 Monticello Community School District
 Western Dubuque Community School District

Political districts
 Iowa's 1st congressional district
 State House District 31
 State Senate District 16

References
 United States Census Bureau 2007 TIGER/Line Shapefiles
 United States Board on Geographic Names (GNIS)
 United States National Atlas

External links

 
US-Counties.com
City-Data.com

Townships in Dubuque County, Iowa
Townships in Iowa